Helsinki has a total area of .   of it is land and  of the area is covered with water.

Subdivisions 
This is a listing of the neighborhoods and localities in the city of Helsinki in alphabetical order. The list is not complete.

Climate 
Average temperature (2001): +5.9 °C (42 °F)
Warmest month, July, average temperature: +17.2 °C (63 °F)
Coldest month, February, average temperature: -4.7 °C (23 °F)

See also 
 Helsinki Metropolitan Area

References